Nemanja Stefanović ([ně̞maɲa stefǎːnoʋitɕ]) (born 12 February 2001 in Novi Sad) is a Serbian volleyball player. He is 200 cm tall, and he plays as a setter.

Career

His brother 
Stefanovic has one younger brother Dusan Stefanovic born in 2003. His brother is studying in Economic school in Novi Sad, Serbia after he graduated in Gymnasium Jovan Jovanovic Zmaj.

Club career 
Stefanović started his professional career in Crvena Zvezda Belgrade, where he was playing for six seasons before he joined Vojvodina . He played one season for Vojvodina.
At the end of the 2011/2012 season, he signed for Polish team AZS Politechnika Warszawska.

National team career 
Stefanović was member of Serbia junior national team, and he also played for University National Team of Serbia at Summer University Games in 2007 and 2009. He also made several caps for senior national team as well during the year 2012.

References

External links 
Nemanja Stefanović Volleyball Forever

1989 births
Living people
Serbian men's volleyball players
Serbian expatriate sportspeople in Poland
Serbian expatriate sportspeople in Israel
Serbian expatriate sportspeople in Slovakia